Janesville is a city in Waseca County, Minnesota, United States.  The population was 2,256 at the 2010 census.

U.S. Highway 14 serves as a main route in the community, running east–west, south of Janesville.  County Road 3 runs north–south through the town.  There is one disabled stoplight, now a four way stop, in Janesville at the intersection of County Road 3 (Main Street) and old Highway 14.

History
The city of Janesville was established in 1856.
A post office called Janesville has been in operation since 1858. The city was named for Mrs. Jane Sprague, an early settler. Janesville was incorporated in 1870.  Janesville contains two properties listed on the National Register of Historic Places, the Hofmann Apiaries established in 1907 and the 1912 Janesville Free Public Library.

Geography

Demographics

2010 census
As of the census of 2010, there were 2,256 people, 889 households, and 619 families living in the city. The racial makeup of the city was 98.0% White, 0.4% African American, 0.3% Native American, 0.2% Asian, 0.3% from other races, and 0.8% from two or more races. Hispanic or Latino of any race were 1.3% of the population.

There were 889 households, of which 35.9% had children under the age of 18 living with them, 56.1% were married couples living together, 8.8% had a female householder with no husband present, 4.7% had a male householder with no wife present, and 30.4% were non-families. 25.1% of all households were made up of individuals, and 10.4% had someone living alone who was 65 years of age or older. The average household size was 2.49 and the average family size was 2.97.

The median age in the city was 35.4 years. 27.1% of residents were under the age of 18; 6.1% were between the ages of 18 and 24; 29.5% were from 25 to 44; 22.3% were from 45 to 64; and 14.8% were 65 years of age or older. The gender makeup of the city was 48.1% male and 51.9% female.

2000 census
As of the census of 2000, there were 2,109 people, 816 households, and 580 families living in the city. The racial makeup of the city was 97.72% White, 0.09% African American, 0.38% Native American, 0.19% Asian, 0.62% from other races, and 1.00% from two or more races. Hispanic or Latino of any race were 1.61% of the population.

There were 816 households, out of which 35.0% had children under the age of 18 living with them, 60.3% were married couples living together, 7.4% had a female householder with no husband present, and 28.9% were non-families. 25.5% of all households were made up of individuals, and 12.6% had someone living alone who was 65 years of age or older.  The average household size was 2.54 and the average family size was 3.05.

In the city, the population was spread out, with 27.1% under the age of 18, 9.3% from 18 to 24, 28.4% from 25 to 44, 19.2% from 45 to 64, and 16.0% who were 65 years of age or older.  The median age was 34 years. For every 100 females, there were 91.6 males.  For every 100 females age 18 and over, there were 89.1 males.

The median income for a household in the city was $41,667, and the median income for a family was $51,111. Males had a median income of $31,675 versus $21,492 for females. The per capita income for the city was $17,443.  About 1.4% of families and 3.7% of the population were below the poverty line, including 1.4% of those under age 18 and 7.9% of those age 65 or over.

Notable person
 Aaron Sheehan, operatic tenor and professor of music

References

External links
Janesville, Minnesota Official Website

Cities in Minnesota
Cities in Waseca County, Minnesota